Bilateral relations between the Kingdom of Bahrain and the State of Kuwait began on 19 August 1971.

Country comparison

Relations
On 5 July 2011, the media advisor to the Bahraini monarch, Nabil al-Hamir, was quoted as saying that Bahrain–Kuwait relations "have stood the test of time" and  "have coalesced into a binding brotherhood between the nations".

On 7 November 2014, the Kuwaiti emir, Sabah Al-Ahmad Al-Jaber Al-Sabah visited the Bahraini king. They discussed ways to increase unity in the GCC and regional and global developments.

See also 
 Foreign relations of Bahrain
 Foreign relations of Kuwait

References

 
Kuwait
Bilateral relations of Kuwait